Treowen Halt railway station served the village of Wonastow, Monmouthshire, Wales, from 1927 to 1960 on the Newport, Abergavenny and Hereford Railway.

History 
The station was opened on 14 March 1927 by the Great Western Railway. It closed on 11 July 1960.

References 

Disused railway stations in Monmouthshire
Railway stations in Great Britain opened in 1927
Railway stations in Great Britain closed in 1960
1927 establishments in Wales
1960 disestablishments in Wales
Former Great Western Railway stations